Dr. MGR-Janaki College of Arts and Science for Women is a college for women in the Sathyabama MGR Maligai Campus in Chennai. V. N. Janaki Ramachandran, former Chief Minister of Tamil Nadu, help found the college in memory of her husband Bharat Ratna Dr. M.G. Ramachandran, and is currently managed and administered by the Directors of Sathya Studios Private Limited.

Affiliation and accreditation

The courses offered by the college are affiliated to the University of Madras. The college received permission from the Government of Tamil Nadu and is affiliated to the University of Madras.

Motto

The motto of the college is "Excellence through Diligence."

References

External links
 Official website

Photos

Schools of social work
Women's universities and colleges in Chennai
Arts and Science colleges in Chennai
Colleges affiliated to University of Madras
Memorials to M G Ramachandran
Educational institutions established in 1996
1996 establishments in Tamil Nadu

de:University of Madras